Lovchev is a Russian male surname, its feminine counterpart is Lovcheva. It may refer to
Aleksey Lovchev (born 1989), Russian weightlifter 
German Lovchev (born 1981), Russian association football player
Evgeniy Lovchev (born 1975), Russian association football player
Evgeny Lovchev (born 1949), Russian association football official and player, father of Evgeniy

Russian-language surnames